Nanva (also Romanized as Nānvā; also known as Bakhshābād) is a village in Hokmabad Rural District, Atamalek District, Jowayin County, Razavi Khorasan Province, Iran. At the 2006 census, its population was 667, in 157 families.

References 

Populated places in Joveyn County